Roger Bisseron (27 August 1905 – 28 June 1992) was a French racing cyclist. He won the French national road race title in 1930.

References

External links
 

1905 births
1992 deaths
French male cyclists
Sportspeople from Haute-Marne
Cyclists from Grand Est
20th-century French people